Crossbow was an early 1970s proa (or asymmetrical catamaran) sailboat.

The vessel was 56 feet long and had a 60 foot mast, but was only 22 inches wide. It was built of cold moulded plywood. The smaller, outrigger hull was removed by 30 feet from the main hull.

In 1972 Crossbow claimed the record for the world's fastest yacht at 26.3 knots.

Crossbow has been preserved and is owned by Sir Timothy Colman.

See also
List of multihulls
Crossbow II
Sir Timothy James Alan Colman

References

Individual catamarans
1970s sailing yachts